Several polling firms have conducted opinion polls during the term of the 53rd New Zealand Parliament (2020–present) for the 2023 New Zealand general election. The regular polls are the quarterly polls produced by Television New Zealand (1 News) conducted by Kantar Public (formerly known as Colmar Brunton) and Discovery New Zealand (Newshub) conducted by Reid Research, along with monthly polls by Roy Morgan Research, and by Curia (Taxpayers' Union). The sample size, margin of error and confidence interval of each poll varies by organisation and date.

The current parliament was elected on 17 October 2020. The next general election is scheduled to take place on October 14, 2023.

Party vote

Nationwide polling 
Poll results are listed in the table below in reverse chronological order. The highest percentage figure in each polling survey is displayed in bold, and the background shaded in the leading party's colour. The 'party lead' column shows the percentage-point difference between the two parties with the highest figures. In the instance of a tie, both figures are shaded and displayed in bold. Percentages may not add to 100 percent due to polls not reporting figures for all minor parties and due to rounding. Refusals are generally excluded from the party vote percentages, while question wording and the treatment of "don't know" responses and those not intending to vote may vary between survey organisations.

The parties shown in the table are Labour (LAB), National (NAT), Green (GRN), ACT, Māori (TPM), New Zealand First (NZF), Opportunities (TOP), and New Conservative (NCP). Other parties may have also registered in some polls, but are not listed in this table.

Subnational polling

Tauranga

Preferred prime minister

Some opinion pollsters ask voters who they would prefer as prime minister. The phrasing of questions and the treatment of refusals, as well as "don't know" answers, differ from poll to poll. To qualify for this table, this person must reach at least 3 percent in three separate polls. The table below includes private polls conducted by Talbot Mills (previously called UMR; conducted for Labour) and Curia (conducted for the Taxpayers' Union, formerly for National), which may be cherry-picked and therefore may not properly indicate ongoing trends.

Government approval rating

The government approval rating is a statistic which measures the proportion of people who say they think the country is heading in the right direction or wrong direction politically.

Forecasts

See also 
2020 New Zealand general election
Opinion polling for the 2020 New Zealand general election
Politics of New Zealand

Notes

References

2023 New Zealand general election
 
New Zealand